Ian Bruce Lang, Baron Lang of Monkton, PC DL (born 27 June 1940) is a British Conservative Party politician and Life Peer who served as the Member of Parliament for Galloway, and then Galloway and Upper Nithsdale, from 1979 to 1997.

On 29 September 1997 Lang was raised to the peerage. He was an active member of the House of Lords until his retirement on 30 June 2022, including being the Chairman of the Constitution Committee. He also served as Chair of the Advisory Committee on Business Appointments from 2009 to 2014.

Early life
Lang was educated at Lathallan School, at Rugby School from 1954 to 1958, and at Sidney Sussex College, Cambridge from 1959 to 1962, where he obtained a BA (Hons.) degree in history. He was also a member of the Cambridge Footlights.

Parliamentary career
Lang first stood for Parliament for Central Ayrshire in 1970, but was unsuccessful. In the February 1974 general election he was defeated by Labour's James White contesting Glasgow Pollok.

Following this he became MP for Galloway from 1979 to 1983 and for Galloway and Upper Nithsdale from 1983 to 1997, and was a minister for a number of years. He served as Assistant Government Whip from 1981 to 1983 and as Government Whip from 1983 to 1986, before becoming Under-Secretary of State for Employment in 1986. He then served as Under-Secretary of State for Scotland from 1986 to 1987, before rising to the position of Minister of State for Scotland, which he held from 1987 to 1990. Lang then joined the Cabinet as Secretary of State for Scotland from 1990 to 1995, before becoming the Secretary of State for Trade and Industry and President of the Board of Trade from 1995 until 1997. He was closely involved in John Major's re-election campaign as leader of the Conservative Party in July 1995.

Lang lost his seat in the 1997 general election, one of seven Cabinet members to do so (the others being Malcolm Rifkind, Michael Portillo, Michael Forsyth, Roger Freeman, William Waldegrave and Tony Newton).

House of Lords

Following the loss of his seat, Lang was raised to the peerage in the 1997 Prime Minister's Resignation Honours as Baron Lang of Monkton, of Merrick and the Rhinns of Kells in Dumfries and Galloway. He has remained an active member of the House of Lords, including being Chairman of the Constitution Committee between 2014 and 2017.

Previously Lang served as Chair of the Advisory Committee on Business Appointments from 2009 to 2014.

Since 1997, Lang has been a member of the board of directors of Marsh & McLennan Companies, becoming Chairman in May 2011. Lang has also been a Non-Executive Director of Charlemagne Capital Limited since 2006, and Deputy Chairman of European Telecom PLC since 1997.

On 30 January 2014 Lang stated that if Scotland voted for independence, it would dishonour the sacrifice of those who died fighting for Great Britain in the First World War.

Arms

References

External links
 
 Lord Lang of Monkton

|-

|-

|-

|-

1940 births
Living people
People educated at Lathallan School
People educated at Rugby School
Alumni of Sidney Sussex College, Cambridge
Members of the Parliament of the United Kingdom for Scottish constituencies
British Secretaries of State
Secretaries of State for Scotland
Lang of Monckton
Life peers created by Elizabeth II
Members of the Privy Council of the United Kingdom
Scottish Conservative Party MPs
UK MPs 1979–1983
UK MPs 1983–1987
UK MPs 1987–1992
UK MPs 1992–1997
Presidents of the Board of Trade